Dance Wicked is an album by the reggae musician Michael Rose, released in 1997 by Heartbeat Records. A dub version of the album, Dub Wicked, was released at the same time.

Production
The album was recorded in England, and was produced by David "Fluxy" Heywood and Leroy "Mafia" Heywood. Maxi Priest contributed vocals to "Lion in the Jungle".

Critical reception
The Boston Globe thought that "Rose, who has one of the most copied vocal styles in reggae, acquits himself well with both love songs and social commentary." The Chicago Tribune called the album "a fetching swirl of old and new reggae styles charged with Rose's soulful crooning and topical lyrics." The Boston Herald deemed it "a near-masterpiece" and "a blast of roots rhythm and attitude that remains undiluted by the sleek, up-to-the-minute production of Mafia and Fluxy." The Times-Picayune wrote that Dance Wicked is "a marriage of old and new, in which contemporary, hip-hop-influenced programmed beats and rhythms are overlaid with Rose's roots reggae vocal delivery." 

AllMusic wrote that "Dance Wicked is a stellar set, a sumptuous aural banquet that may start in the past, but moves the party quickly into the present and well into the wee hours, as Rose's words and the diverse music really begin to hit home."

Track listing
Happiness	    
Dance Wicked	 
Lion in the Jungle (featuring Maxi Priest)	 
Run Dem a Run	 
Dreadlocks	 
Reality	 
Landlord	 
See and Blind	 
I Don't Want to Say Goodbye	 
Mind Made Up	 
Never Get Me Down	 
Life in the Ghetto	 
Mind Made Up - (Soul Up Mix)	 
Mind Made Up - (Soul Up Instrumental instrumental)

References

1997 albums
Michael Rose (singer) albums